Sierra de Sangra is an extinct ice-clad stratovolcano with its summit located 10 km east of Villa O'Higgins. The volcanic masiff is heavily eroded and constitutes part of the Argentine-Chilean border in Patagonia.

Landforms of Santa Cruz Province, Argentina
Landforms of Aysén Region
Mountains of Argentina
Stratovolcanoes of Argentina
Mountains of Aysén Region
Stratovolcanoes of Chile
Argentina–Chile border
International mountains of South America
Extinct volcanoes